The Dicranidae are a widespread and diverse subclass of mosses in class Bryopsida, with many species of dry or disturbed areas. They are distinguished by their spores; the peristome teeth are haplolepideous with a 4:2:3 formula, and an exostome is absent.

References

Plant subclasses
Bryopsida